Dahira nili is a moth of the family Sphingidae which is endemic to China.

References

External links

nili
Moths described in 2006
Endemic fauna of China
Moths of Asia